Uroleucon minutum, is an aphid in the superfamily Aphidoidea in the order Hemiptera. It is a true bug and sucks sap from plants.

References 

 http://animaldiversity.org/accounts/Uroleucon_minutum/classification/
 https://www.gbif.org/species/125065691
 http://aphid.aphidnet.org/Uroleucon_minutum.php
 http://www.catalogueoflife.org/col/search/all/key/Uroleucon+minutum

Agricultural pest insects
Insects described in 1918
Macrosiphini